Muridke (Punjabi), is a city and headquarters of Muridke Tehsil of Sheikhupura District in Punjab, Pakistan. It is the 53rd largest city of Pakistan by population. Muridke is situated near the city of Lahore, at an elevation of 205 m (675 ft) and is situated on the Grand Trunk Road.

In 2005, Muridke became the headquarters of the newly created Muridke Tehsil of Sheikhupura District.

Schools 
Chand Bagh School is situated on the Muridke-Sheikhupura road.

Notable people
 Iqbal Masih, former child slave and later activist
 Jaffar Nazir, first-class cricketer
 Bilawal Bhatti, international cricketer
 Imran Nazir, international cricketer

References

Populated places in Sheikhupura District